This is a list of cities, towns, villages and hamlets in County Armagh, Northern Ireland. See the list of places in Northern Ireland for places in other counties.

Towns are listed in bold.

A
Acton
Aghacommon
Annaghmore
Annahugh
 Annaloist
Ardress
Armagh
Aughanduff

B
Ballymacnab
Bannfoot
Belleeks
Bessbrook
Blackwatertown
Bleary
Broomhill
Ballydougan

C
Camlough
Carrickaness
Charlemont
Cladymore
Clonmore
Collegeland
Corrinshego
Craigavon
Creeveroe
Creggan
Crossmaglen
Cullaville
Cullyhanna

D
Darkley
Derryadd
Derrycrew
Derryhale
Derrymacash
Derrynoose
Derrytrasna
Dollingstown
Dorsey
Dromintee
Drumnacanvy

E
Edenaveys

F
Forkill

G
Gibson's Hill
Granemore

H
Hamiltonsbawn

J
Jonesborough

K
Keady
Kernan
Killean
Killylea
Kilmore

L
Lislea
Lisnadill
Loughgall
Loughgilly
Lurgan

M
Madden
Maghery
Markethill
Meigh
Middletown
Milford
Mountnorris
Mullaghbawn
Mullaghbrack
Mullaghglass
Mullavilly-Laurelvale

N
Newry (part)
Newtownhamilton

P
Portadown
Poyntzpass

R
Richhill

S
Scotch Street
Silverbridge

T
 Tannaghmore North 
Tandragee
Tartaraghan
The Birches
Tullynawood
Tynan

W
Whitecross
Waringstown

See also
List of civil parishes of County Armagh
List of townlands in County Armagh

References

Geography of County Armagh
Armagh
Armagh, List of places in County
Places